BIOS Scientific Publishers was an English publisher. The main offices were based at Milton Park near Abingdon, Oxfordshire, south of Oxford, England. The company specialised in biosciences.

Taylor & Francis acquired BIOS Scientific Publishers in 2003; the imprint closed in 2005.

References 

Book publishing company imprints
Companies based in Oxfordshire